Stephen Raj Bhavsar (born September 7, 1980) is an American artistic gymnast. He was a member of the 2001 and 2003 World Championships U.S. team. He earned a bronze medal as a member of the 2008 U.S. Olympic Team. He was originally an alternate, but was named to the team following the injury withdrawal of Paul Hamm. At the Games, Bhavsar earned a bronze medal with the U.S. team in Artistic Gymnastics with teammates Alexander Artemev, Joey Hagerty, Jonathan Horton, Justin Spring, and Kai Wen Tan.

He was a contender for the 2004 Olympic Team, and was named as an alternate.

Biography
Raj Bhavsar is a Gujarati. He is the son of Jyotindra and Surekha Bhavsar. His father is from Vadodara, Gujarat, and his mother was born in Kampala, Uganda but educated in Gujarat. He was born in Houston. He was raised in Greater Houston and attended Bear Creek Elementary, Wolfe Elementary, Mayde Creek Junior High and Mayde Creek High School.  During this time he trained at Cypress Academy of Gymnastics under his coach Bill Foster.

Bhavsar was a member of the United States team to the 2001 World Artistic Gymnastics Championships and won the silver medal with the team. He won a second silver medal at the 2003 World Artistic Gymnastics Championships.

At the 2004 Olympic Trials, he was in contention for the U.S. Olympic Team. He was named as an alternate. In 2004 he was first in the rings in the trials, and fourth overall in the national championships, yet was passed over. In 2008 he was third in the Olympic trials and the Visa Championships and again wound up an alternate to the 6-man team.  This was due to the fact that his strongest events overlapped with those of Paul Hamm and Morgan Hamm, and the team needed gymnasts who were stronger in other disciplines.  After Paul Hamm was injured, Bhavsar was selected to the team which earned a bronze medal.

He attended Ohio State University and won the NCAA title with that team. He won the All-Around at the 2002 NCAA Championships.

Bhavsar is the creator of two new gymnastics elements, which are now named after him.  "The Bhavsar" on the still rings was created in 2003.  It is a front lever start with movement into a final position called a Maltese.  "The Bhavsar" on parallel bars was created and performed in 2009 at the Moscow World Cup.  This is a tkatchev style release move starting on one end of the bars and finishing on the other.

After obtaining his goals as an Olympic gymnast, in 2010 Bhavsar started working for Cirque du Soleil as an artist for their performance show Iris which debuted in July 2011.

References

External links

 
 USA's Bhavasar finally realizes his dream at USATODAY.COM

1980 births
Living people
American male artistic gymnasts
Medalists at the World Artistic Gymnastics Championships
Olympic bronze medalists for the United States in gymnastics
Gymnasts at the 1999 Pan American Games
Gymnasts at the 2008 Summer Olympics
Sportspeople from Houston
Ohio State University alumni
American sportspeople of Indian descent
American Hindus
Medalists at the 2008 Summer Olympics
Gujarati people
Pan American Games silver medalists for the United States
Pan American Games medalists in gymnastics
American people of Gujarati descent
Medalists at the 1999 Pan American Games
Originators of elements in artistic gymnastics